Mario Ngqiuyomizi Saliwa (6 March 1984 – 31 May 2015) was a South African first-class cricketer. He died of injuries after being stabbed.

References

External links
 

1984 births
2015 deaths
South African cricketers
Sportspeople from Qonce
Cricketers from the Eastern Cape
Deaths by stabbing in South Africa